Hot Chocolate are a British soul band popular during the 1970s and 1980s, formed by Errol Brown and Tony Wilson. The group had at least one hit song every year on the UK Singles Chart from 1970 to 1980.

Their hits include, "You Sexy Thing", a UK number two which also made the top 10 in three decades and reached number three on the US Billboard Hot 100—the song also featured in the popular British comedy film The Full Monty (1997)—"So You Win Again", topped the UK Charts, "Every 1's a Winner", reached number six in the US, "It Started with a Kiss", UK top five, and "Emma", charted at number three in the UK and number 8 in the US. In 2004, Brown received the Ivor Novello Award for Outstanding Contribution to British Music from the British Academy of Songwriters, Composers and Authors.

Beginnings
Formed in 1968, the band initially consisted of vocalist Errol Brown, guitarist Franklyn De Allie, drummer Jim King (shortly thereafter replaced by the unrelated Ian King), percussionist Patrick Olive, and bassist Tony Wilson; with keyboardist Larry Ferguson joining the band in the following year. The band was originally named "Hot Chocolate Band" by Mavis Smith, who worked for the Apple Corps press office. This was quickly shortened first to "The Hot Chocolate" and then to "Hot Chocolate" by Mickie Most. By 1970 the band's line-up had changed again to include Harvey Hinsley and Tony Connor (who was also a member of Audience at the time) replacing De Allie and King respectively.

Hot Chocolate started their recording career making a reggae version of John Lennon's "Give Peace a Chance", but frontman Errol Brown was told he needed permission. He was contacted by Apple Records, discovered that Lennon liked his version, and the group was subsequently signed to Apple Records. The link was short-lived as the Beatles were starting to break up, and the Apple connection soon ended.

Later in 1970 Hot Chocolate, with the help of record producer Mickie Most, began releasing tracks that became hits, such as "Love Is Life", "Emma", "You Could Have Been a Lady" (a US and Canadian hit for April Wine), and "I Believe in Love". All those releases were on the Rak record label, owned by Most. Brown and bassist Tony Wilson wrote most of their original material, and also provided hits for Herman's Hermits, "Bet Yer Life I Do", Julie Felix, "Heaven Is Here", and Mary Hopkin, "Think About Your Children".
 
Gradually the band started to become UK Singles Chart regulars. One of the hits from this period, "Brother Louie", featured a guest spoken vocal from Alexis Korner.

Success
Hot Chocolate became a big success in the disco era of the mid-1970s. A combination of high production standards, the growing confidence of the main songwriting team of Wilson and Brown, and tight vocal harmonies enabled them to secure further big hits such as "You Sexy Thing" and "Every 1's a Winner", which were also US hits, peaking at No. 3 (1976) and No. 6 (1979), respectively. After Wilson's departure for a solo career, that included a 1976 album I Like Your Style, Brown assumed all songwriting duties. Wilson was initially replaced by Brian Satterwhite; before Satterwhite departed the band and Olive switched to bass as his primary instrument.

In 1977, after 15 hits, they finally reached number one with "So You Win Again". It was one of the few of their recordings that was not written, at least partly, by Brown The track was a Russ Ballard composition.

The band became the only group, and one of just three acts, that had a hit in every year of the 1970s in the UK charts (the other two being Elvis Presley and Diana Ross). The band eventually had at least one hit, every year, between 1970 and 1984.

The band continued well into the 1980s, and clocked up another big hit record: "It Started with a Kiss", in 1982, which reached number 5 in the UK. In all, the group charted 25 UK top 40 hit singles. Their single "You Sexy Thing" became the only track that made British top ten status in the 1970s, 1980s and 1990s.

In 1987, Dutch DJ and producer Ben Liebrand made remixes of the Hot Chocolate hits; "You Sexy Thing" and "Every 1's a Winner". Liebrand also made a combination remix of those two hits called "Two in a Bed"  for the exclusive Disco Mix Club.

Later years
Renewed interest in Hot Chocolate came in part with the band's appearances on a string of successful film soundtracks starting with the 1997 comedy The Full Monty, as well as in a 1989 acne lotion commercial (featuring a young Patsy Palmer). From the late 1980s onwards the group experienced a resurgence of credibility: Urge Overkill, PJ Harvey and the Sisters of Mercy all added Hot Chocolate songs to their live sets, and Cud's cover of "You Sexy Thing" featured in John Peel's Festive 50.

Errol Brown and Larry Ferguson departed the band in 1986; ultimately leading the group to disband. Brown then began a solo career. Two of his singles made the UK Singles Chart – "Personal Touch" and "Body Rockin'". Hot Chocolate had a hit in 1988 in Germany. "Never Pretend" was written by Harvey Hinsley and Susan Stuttard, and the vocalist was Grant Evelyn. The band's enduring popularity was verified when two compilation albums both reached No. 1 in the UK Albums Chart (see below). In 2003, Errol Brown received the MBE; and in 2004, the Ivor Novello Award for his contribution to British music.

In 1992 the band reformed with new vocalist Greg Bannis and keyboardists Steve Ansell, Andy Smith, Willy Dowling, and Steve Matthews (the latter two of whom departed the band in 1994), and manager and agent Ric Martin took control over the band's bookings and live appearances. Kennie Simon took over lead vocals in 2010 following the departure of Bannis and Hot Chocolate continue to make live appearances in the UK and Europe.

On 6 May 2015, original frontman and principal songwriter Errol Brown died from liver cancer. He was 71.

Personnel

Members

Current members
Patrick Olive – percussion (1968–1984, 1988, 1992–present), bass (1975–1984, 1988, 1992–present)
Tony Connor – drums, percussion (1970–1986, 1988, 1992–present)
Harvey Hinsley – guitars (1970–1986, 1988, 1992–present)
Steve Ansell – keyboards, guitars (1994–present)
Andy Smith – keyboards (1994–present)
Kennie Simon – lead vocals, keyboards (2010–present)

Former members
Errol Brown – lead vocals (1968–1986)
Tony Wilson – bass, lead vocals (1968–1975)
Franklyn De Allie – guitars (1968–1970)
Jim King – drums, percussion (1968–1970)
Larry Ferguson – keyboards (1969–1986)
Derek Lewis – percussion, backing vocals (1975)
Brian Satterwhite – bass, backing vocals (1975)
Rick Green - keyboards (1975)
Chris Cameron - keyboards, backing vocals (1982–1985) 
Grant Evelyn – lead vocals (1988)
Greg Bannis – lead vocals (1992–2010)
Willy Dowling – keyboards, backing vocals (1992–1994)
Steve Matthews – keyboards, backing vocals (1992–1994)

Line-ups

Timeline

Discography

Studio Albums
All albums released by Rak Records unless otherwise noted.
 Cicero Park	(1974)
 Hot Chocolate (1975)	
 Man to Man	(1976)
 Every 1's a Winner (1978)
 Going Through the Motions	(1979)
 Class (1980)
 Mystery	(1982)
 Love Shot	(1983)
 Strictly Dance (1993, Polydor)

References

External links
Errol Brown's site
Hot Chocolate's site 
Errol Brown interview by Pete Lewis, Blues & Soul February 2009
The Complete Apple Records
Hot Chocolate on Discogs.com

Musical groups established in 1969
Apple Records artists
British disco groups
English pop music groups
British soul musical groups
English funk musical groups
Musical groups from London
British rhythm and blues musical groups
Rak Records artists
Big Tree Records artists